Changes is the third album released by American funk/soul singer Charles Bradley, released on April 1, 2016 on Daptone Records. The title track on the album is a cover of the Black Sabbath song of the same name and was first released as a Record Store Day Black Friday single in 2013.

Critical reception

The album was released to positive critical reception with an aggregate score of 80 on Metacritic based on 17 reviews.

Pitchfork awarded the album a score of 7.1, with music critic Jay Balfour describing the album as Bradley's "most straightforward and best to date". AllMusic awarded the album a positive review, stating that "the rough-hewn power of Bradley's voice is at its most powerful, and there's a fierce sense of longing and need in this music that's almost tactile in its realism".

The Observer'''s Kitty Empire awarded the album 3 stars, likening Bradley to Al Green, while critic Steve Horowitz from PopMatters praised Bradley's vocal style, describing him as "the closest living equivalent to [James] Brown" and concluding that "Bradley sings of his aches and pleasures with such conviction that he makes one believe this is possible".

The album also received praise from a number of other musical publications, including American Songwriter, Record Collector and Paste''.

Accolades

Track listing

Personnel
 Charles Bradley – vocals

Menahan Street Band

 Victor Axelrod – piano/vibraphone
 Thomas Brenneck – guitar/bass guitar/organ/percussion
 Nick Movshon – bass guitar
 Homer Steinweiss – drums
 Michael Deller – organ
 David Guy – trumpet
 Leon Michels – saxophone/organ/flute

The Budos Band

 Jared Tankel – baritone saxophone
 Thomas Brenneck – electric guitar
 John Carbonella Jr. – congas, drums
 Mike Deller – organ
 Daniel Foder – bass guitar
 Andrew Greene – trumpet
 Rob Lombardo – bongos, congas
 Brian Profilio – drums
 Dame Rodriguez – percussion

The Gospel Queens

 Naomi Shelton – leading vocals
 Cliff Driver – pianist
 Bobbie Jean Gant – background vocals
 Edna Johnson – background vocals
 Gabriel Caplan – guitars
 Fred Thomas – bass
 Michael Post – drums

Additional Musicians
 Raynier Jacildo – Organ on “God Bless America”
 William Schalda Jr. – Piano, Organ & Mellotron on "Things We Do For Love"

References

2016 albums
Charles Bradley (singer) albums
Daptone Records albums